The inauguration of Abdurrahman Wahid as the fourth president of Indonesia took place on Wednesday, 20 October 1999 at the DPR/MPR Building, Jakarta. The ceremony marked the commencement of Wahid's only term as president.

Wahid's term as president only lasted for one year, nine months, and four days, his term ended following his decree to suspend the People's Consultative Assembly and the People's Representative Council on July 23, 2001.

Background
In 1999 Wahid was elected as president beating Megawati Sukarnoputri by 373 votes to 313, he was the first candidate to win the presidency through a vote by the People’s Consultative Assembly. The following day, Megawati was nominated by Gus Dur's party as vice president and got elected, beating Hamzah Haz from the PPP by 396 votes to 284.

See also
First inauguration of Suharto
Inauguration of B. J. Habibie

Notes

References

1990s in Jakarta
1999 in Indonesia
Abdurrahman Wahid